Martin Crompton (born 29 September 1969) is a former professional rugby league footballer who played in the 1980s, 1990s and 2000s, usually as a .

Born in Ince-in-Makerfield, Wigan, Crompton initially played for Warrington (Heritage № 865). Crompton played  in Warrington's 14-36 defeat by Wigan in the 1990 Challenge Cup Final during the 1989–90 season at Wembley Stadium, London on Saturday 28 April 1990, in front of a crowd of 77,729.

He moved to his hometown club Wigan in 1992. During the 1992–93 Rugby Football League season Crompton played from the interchange bench for defending RFL champions Wigan in the 1992 World Club Challenge against the visiting Brisbane Broncos.

After a season with Wigan, Crompton went to Oldham in 1993 and was captain of the Roughyeds. When Oldham was relegated from Super League, Crompton went to Salford City Reds. After a few seasons with Salford, he moved to Widnes Vikings, helping the club win promotion to the Super League. He retired from rugby league but was an assistant coach at Widnes. As of 2009, he is coaching the Blackpool Panthers.

Crompton played as an interchange/substitute, i.e. number 15, (replacing  Martin Offiah ) in Wigan's 5-4 victory over St. Helens in the 1992 Lancashire County Cup Final during the 1992–93 season at Knowsley Road, St. Helens on Sunday 18 October 1992.

Crompton was an Ireland international and played at the 2000 Rugby League World Cup.

References

External links
The Teams: Ireland
Statistics at orl-heritagetrust.org.uk
Profile at wigan.rlfans.com
Profile at wolvesplayers.thisiswarrington.co.uk
Profile at rugby.widnes.tv

1969 births
Living people
Blackpool Panthers coaches
English rugby league coaches
English rugby league players
Ireland national rugby league team captains
Ireland national rugby league team players
Oldham R.L.F.C. players
People from Ince-in-Makerfield
Rugby league halfbacks
Rugby league players from Wigan
Salford Red Devils players
Warrington Wolves players
Widnes Vikings players
Wigan Warriors players